The 2010 Generali Ladies Linz was a women's tennis tournament played on indoor hard courts. It was the 24th edition of the Generali Ladies Linz, and part of the WTA International tournaments of the 2010 WTA Tour. It was held at the TipsArena Linz in Linz, Austria, from October 9 through October 17, 2010.

World No. 1 Serena Williams was due to make her comeback from foot surgery at this tournament, but she withdrew after reaggregating the injury at training. Her original wildcard slot was therefore given to Ana Ivanovic. Agnieszka Radwańska also withdrew from the tournament due to a stress fracture in her foot.

Ivanovic won the title, defeating Patty Schnyder in the championship match which lasted 47 minutes; it was the shortest championship match of the season. The victory also ended a two-year title drought, and raised her ranking up from World No. 36 to World No. 26.

WTA players

Seeds 

 Seeds are based on the rankings of October 4, 2010.

Other entrants
The following players received wildcards into the singles main draw:
  Sybille Bammer
  Ana Ivanovic1
  Yvonne Meusburger
  Serena Williams

1 Ana Ivanovic received the wildcard originally allocated to Serena Williams after the latter withdrew from the tournament due to ongoing foot surgery.

The following players received entry from the qualifying draw:
  Eleni Daniilidou
  Polona Hercog
  Sesil Karatantcheva
  Renata Voráčová

The following player received entry as a lucky loser into the singles main draw:
  Sorana Cîrstea

Withdrawals
  Serena Williams
  Agnieszka Radwańska

Champions

Singles

 Ana Ivanovic def.  Patty Schnyder, 6–1, 6–2

 It was Ivanovic's first title of the year, her first in two years, and the ninth of her career.

Doubles

 Renata Voráčová /  Barbora Záhlavová-Strýcová def.  Květa Peschke /  Katarina Srebotnik, 7–5, 7–6(6)

References

External links
Official website

Generali Ladies Linz
2010
Generali Ladies Linz
Generali Ladies Linz
Generali